Suburban Life was an American shelter magazine, which ran from 1904 to 1917. It was directed toward the modern family who lived outside the city. A typical issue would feature stories on topics such as: home furniture, improvements and remodeling, practical hints, harvesting crops, profitable hobbies (e.g. beekeeping), scenic sights, woodland animals, protecting birds, camp activities, tree varieties, construction projects, successful gardening, perils and pleasures of farming. They were submitted by field and educational experts.

History 
It was published by Colonial Press; Harrisburg (Pa.), Boston and New York City 1904–07 ... The next publisher was the Suburban Press; Harrisburg, Boston and New York City 1907–16 ... The final was the Independent Corporation; Harrisburg and New York City 1916–17. A contributing editor was the agricultural giant, Liberty Hyde Bailey, from 1914 to 1916.

The original title was Suburban Country Life. It was changed two months later to Suburban Life. Hoping to gain a larger readership, the title and format was changed to the Countryside Magazine and Suburban Life, in October 1914. It lasted until July 1917. The title was Suburban Life from February 1905 to September 1914. That's the vast majority of the magazine's history.

A lawsuit was filed by a competitor, Country Life in America, due to their similar names in January 1905. Suburban Country Life dropped the middle word in its name after only two issues, in order to avoid a long and costly trial. This was explained in its February issue of 1905 on p. 2 ("Around the Office Desk").

Leading the original staff was President Denman Blanchard, and Vice President / General Manager Frank A. Arnold. The presidency was later turned over to Arnold.

References

Defunct magazines published in the United States
Lifestyle magazines published in the United States